Tseng Yi-hsuan (born 5 December 1988) is a Taiwanese taekwondo practitioner. She won a silver medal in bantamweight at the 2007 World Taekwondo Championships. She won bronze medals at the 2008 and 2012 Asian Taekwondo Championships. She competed at the 2006 Asian Games and the 2010 Asian Games.

References

External links

1988 births
Living people
Taiwanese female taekwondo practitioners
Taekwondo practitioners at the 2006 Asian Games
Taekwondo practitioners at the 2010 Asian Games
World Taekwondo Championships medalists
Asian Taekwondo Championships medalists
Asian Games competitors for Chinese Taipei
21st-century Taiwanese women